Picnic Spot, Lachhiwala is a popular local destination in Doiwala, in the state of Uttarakhand, India, and the nearby regions, situated on the banks of a tributary of the nearby Song river. Its major attractions are the verdant forest, man-made water pools and a scenic setting, all overseen by the forest department of the country. It also houses one of the most popular forest houses in the area, which serves as an administrative and tourist center. Local forest authorities estimate that around at least 250,000 people visit the site each year, with peak season footfall in April–May comfortably exceeding 5000 people per day.

References

Dehradun district
Geography of Uttarakhand
Tourist attractions in Uttarakhand